Antiblemma imitans is a moth of the family Noctuidae first described by Francis Walker in 1858. It is found in Honduras and French Guiana.

The wingspan is about 33 mm.

References

External links
Image

Catocalinae
Moths of Central America
Moths of South America